Nepotilla excavata is a species of sea snail, a marine gastropod mollusk in the family Raphitomidae.

Description
The length of the shell varies between 1.5 mm and 2 mm.

Distribution
This marine species is endemic to Australia and occurs off Tasmania, New South Wales, Victoria and South Australia.

References

 Gatliff, J.H. 1906. On some Victorian marine Mollusca, new species, and others little-known. Proceedings of the Royal Society of Victoria n.s. 19(1): 1-4, pls 1-2 
 May, W.L. 1923. An illustrated index of Tasmanian shells: with 47 plates and 1052 species. Hobart : Government Printer 100 pp.
 Laseron, C. 1954. Revision of the New South Wales Turridae (Mollusca). Australian Zoological Handbook. Sydney : Royal Zoological Society of New South Wales pp. 56, pls 1–12.

External links
 Molluscs of Tasmania: Nepotilla excavata
 

excavata
Gastropods described in 1906
Gastropods of Australia